The 1980 Lower Hutt mayoral election was part of the New Zealand local elections held that same year. The elections were held for the role of Mayor of Lower Hutt plus other local government positions including sixteen city councillors, also elected triennially. The polling was conducted using the standard first-past-the-post electoral method.

Background
The incumbent Mayor, John Kennedy-Good, stood for a fifth term and was re-elected alongside a nearly all-United Citizens council. This included ex-Labour councillor Lawrie Woodley who had defected to the United Citizens mid-term and was rewarded after the 1980 election by Kennedy-Good with a committee chairman position.

Mayoral results

Councillor results

Notes

References

Mayoral elections in Lower Hutt
1980 elections in New Zealand
Politics of the Wellington Region